The Dandenong Ranges National Park is a national park located in the Greater Melbourne region of Victoria, Australia.

In 1997 the Olinda State Forest, Mt. Evelyn and Montrose Reserve were formally added to the national park.

History 
The region was originally inhabited by the Bunurong and Woewurrong Aboriginal people. Most of the forest got cleared when it became a significant source of timber for Melbourne. During the late last century, farming began in the area as roads and railways were built and the 'Puffing Billy' narrow-gauge line from Ferntree Gully to Gembrook started in 1900. Tourism flourished from the 1870s. The Fern Tree Gully was the first to be reserved as a park in 1882 followed by other areas. The present day national park was established in 1987.

Features
Dandenong Ranges National Park is divided into five sections:

 Doongalla Forest – Containing Mount Dandenong itself, and the SkyHigh lookout with panoramic views of Melbourne's east
 Ferntree Gully – The south western section of the Dandenong Ranges National Park, located between the suburbs of Ferntree Gully and Boronia to the west, Upwey to the south, Tremont and Sassafras to the east and The Basin to the north. The park contains the Thousands Steps trail leading to One Tree Hill. The steps are a popular destination for sightseers and fitness enthusiasts alike. During the AFL pre-season a number of Melbourne Australian rules football league and association teams run their players up the steps to promote team fitness. There is no specific creation date of the steps; however, they are believed to be built during the early 1860s when they provided the only means of accessing the One Tree Hill Summit. According to a Tourist Guide published in 1868, all other areas contained thick forest vegetation. A survey of the park found that over 82% of visitors (on weekends) use the park for fitness-related walking. It is also a popular spot for picnics.
 Mount Evelyn Forest is the most northerly section of the park
 Olinda Forest occupies the eastern slopes of Mount Dandenong
 Sherbrooke Forest

Feral pests
Because the park is located in an urban area, the park has a long history of major problems with feral and roaming animals. A cat curfew was introduced in the entire Dandenong Ranges area some years ago, and since then the numbers and variety of lyrebirds and other native species have climbed dramatically.

See also

 Protected areas of Victoria

References

External links

Parks Victoria: Dandenong Ranges National Park page

National parks of Victoria (Australia)
Protected areas established in 1987
Forests of Victoria (Australia)
1987 establishments in Australia
City of Knox
Yarra Ranges